Anne Roussel (born 6 August 1960) is a French actress. She has appeared in more than fifty films since 1981.

Selected filmography

References

External links 

1960 births
Living people
French film actresses